The Broken Jug is a 1937 German historical comedy film directed by Gustav Ucicky and starring Emil Jannings, Friedrich Kayßler and Max Gülstorff. It is an adaptation of the play The Broken Jug by Heinrich von Kleist. The film was popular with Adolf Hitler.

It was shot partly at the Johannisthal Studios in Berlin. The film's sets were designed by the art director Robert Herlth. It premiered at the Ufa-Palast am Zoo.

Plot
A village judge is trying a case to determine who broke the jug. Long before the evidence becomes conclusive against the suspects, it becomes apparent that the judge himself is the guilty one.

Cast
Emil Jannings as Adam
Friedrich Kayßler as Walter
Max Gülstorff as Licht
Lina Carstens as Marthe Rull
Angela Salloker as Eva Rull
Bruno Hübner as Veit Tümpel
Paul Dahlke as Ruprecht Tümpel
Elisabeth Flickenschildt as Frau Brigitte
Walter Werner as operator
Erich Dunskus as beadle
Gisela von Collande as Grethe
Lotte Rausch as Liese
Käthe Kamossa as villager

References

External links

1930s historical comedy films
Courtroom films
German films based on plays
Films based on works by Heinrich von Kleist
Films directed by Gustav Ucicky
Films of Nazi Germany
Films set in the 19th century
German historical comedy films
Films with screenplays by Thea von Harbou
Tobis Film films
German black-and-white films
1930s German-language films
Films shot at Johannisthal Studios
1930s German films